Ani "Anka" Eftimova-Georgieva (Bulgarian: Ани "Анка" Георгиева; born 18 May 1959 in Varna) is a Bulgarian rowing coxswain who competed in the 1980 Summer Olympics.

References

External links
 

1959 births
Living people
Bulgarian female rowers
Olympic rowers of Bulgaria
Rowers at the 1980 Summer Olympics
Olympic bronze medalists for Bulgaria
Olympic medalists in rowing
Medalists at the 1980 Summer Olympics
Sportspeople from Varna, Bulgaria
World Rowing Championships medalists for Bulgaria